Matthew Martin Brammeier (born 7 June 1985) is a former professional cyclist, who competed professionally between 2006 and 2018 for nine different professional teams. Upon retiring, Brammeier became a coach for British Cycling. He won five titles at the Irish National Cycling Championships, winning the road race four times and the time trial once.

Career
Born in Liverpool, Brammeier was selected to ride the 2003 UCI Track Cycling World Championships and represented Wales at the 2006 Commonwealth Games. Brammeier rode for DFL-Cyclingnews-Litespeed in 2006 and signed for Profel Ziegler Continental Team for the 2007 season.

Brammeier was involved in an accident in November 2007, when he was struck by a cement mixing lorry whilst training. He broke both his legs but returned to cycling retaining his contract with Profel in Belgium.

He declared Irish nationality in advance of the 2009–10 track season and made a successful debut when finishing 4th in the scratch race at the Manchester World Cup meeting in October '09. He became road race champion at the Irish National Cycling Championships in June 2010 by beating breakaway partner and defending champion Nicolas Roche.

In 2011, he defended his Irish Elite Road Race title, and also won the National Elite Time Trial title. He joined  for the 2012 season, before joining  for 2013.

After the collapse of Champion System, Brammeier signed a contract with the  team, the Azerbaijan-backed Continental team.

On 9 August 2015, he collided with a team car during Stage 6 of the Tour of Utah. He was immediately taken to hospital following the incident and was diagnosed with injuries to his pelvis, ribs and lung.

In June 2018 Brammeier announced his retirement from competition and his appointment to the position of lead academy coach to British Cycling's men's endurance programme from August of that year, with additional responsibility for the men's elite road team in international competition, taking over the latter from Rod Ellingworth.

Major results

2002
 1st  Points classification Junior Tour of Wales
2003
 British National Junior Road Championships
1st  Road race
1st  Time trial
 1st Chase Classic Under-23
 1st Rod Ellis Memorial
 1st Alan Jewl Memorial
 1st Weaver Valley
 2nd Overall Darley Moor Stage Race
1st Stage 3 (ITT)
 2nd Bath Road Race (National Series)
 2nd Junior Tour of the Peaks
 4th Overall Tour de l'Avenir
2004
 1st Frank Morgan Road race
 2nd Horwich National Criterium
 3rd Seacroft Road Race
2005
 1st John Parkinson Memorial Road race
 5th Overall Flèche du Sud
2007
 1st  Time trial, British National Under-23 Road Championships
2010
 1st  Road race, Irish National Cycling Championships
 3rd Grote Prijs Stad Geel
 3rd Halfords Tour Series Belfast
 4th Halfords Tour Series Dublin
 8th Overall Mi-Août en Bretagne
2011
 Irish National Cycling Championships
1st  Road race
1st  Time trial
2012
 1st  Road race, Irish National Cycling Championships
2013
 1st  Road race, Irish National Cycling Championships
 2nd GP Briek Schotte
2014
 1st  Mountains classification Tour de Langkawi
 6th Overall Tour of China I
2015
 1st Stage 4 Ster ZLM Toer
2016
 2nd Road race, Irish National Cycling Championships

References

External links

Brammeier 2008 diary and x-rays

1985 births
Living people
Commonwealth Games competitors for Wales
Cyclists at the 2006 Commonwealth Games
Irish male cyclists
Welsh track cyclists
Welsh male cyclists
Sportspeople from Liverpool
Welsh cycling coaches